Carlos Samuel Quirós Vázquez (November 20, 1932 – January 23, 2022), He was a former Puerto Rico government official who served as Secretary of State from 1981 from 1985.
 
Quirós attended elementary school at Escuela Labra in Santurce, Puerto Rico. He was an active member of the YMCA in old San Juan during his adolescent years, where in 1948 and 1949 he was selected to be captain of an intramural basketball team. Two years later, in 1950, he was drafted into a soccer team to represent Puerto Rico in the Caribbean and Central American games.

Quiros served in the United States Army during the Korean War.  After three years of service, he returned to Puerto Rico to finish his Master's Degree in Public Administration from the University of Puerto Rico in Río Piedras, Puerto Rico and he worked as a consultant in Central America for a private consulting firm.

In 1968 he accepted a position as executive assistant to the newly elected Mayor of San Juan, Carlos Romero Barcelo.  He served for 8 years as executive assistant and Deputy Mayor.  In 1976 Quirós was appointed by then Governor Romero as Secretary of the Department of Labor.  Under Governor Romero, he also served as Secretary of State from 1981 until 1985. As Secretary of State, he was responsible for major restoration of the Royal Treasury Building and the Provincial Deputation Building, which became the Department of State headquarters in 1984.

After leaving public office, he and his wife Nancy moved to the state of Florida.  He came out of retirement when he was appointed by President George H. W. Bush as a Director at the United States Agency for International Development in Washington, DC. 

After serving in the Federal Government for three years, he again retired to Florida with his wife, Nancy.  He became a widower in December 2011.

In June, 2012, he visited the State Department, where he was welcomed by current Secretary Kenneth McClintock and San Juan City Hall, where he was welcomed by then mayor Jorge Santini.

Carlos died on January 23, 2022, in Tampa, Florida, after a battle with Alzheimer's disease. He is survived by his three sons Carlos, Nelson, and Marvin Samuel. He was interred at Puerto Rico National Cemetery on March 11, 2022.

References

1932 births
2022 deaths
Deaths from Alzheimer's disease
Mayors of San Juan, Puerto Rico
People from Yauco, Puerto Rico
Puerto Rican Army personnel
Secretaries of State of Puerto Rico
United States Army personnel of the Korean War
United States Army officers
University of Puerto Rico alumni